James Hopper may refer to:

James Hopper (writer) (1876–1956),  French-born American writer and novelist
James Hopper (cricketer) (c. 1790–?), English cricketer
Jim Hopper (baseball) (1919–1982), American baseball player 
Jim Hopper (Stranger Things), fictional character